CHSE may refer to:

Centre for Higher Secondary Education - A school in Male', Maldives. 
Council of Higher Secondary Education, Orissa
West Bengal Council of Higher Secondary Education

See also
COHSE